Q. palustris may refer to:

 Quercus palustris, the pin oak or Swamp Spanish oak, a tree species native to eastern North America
 Quiscalus palustris, the slender-billed grackle, a species of bird in the icterid family

See also
 Palustris (disambiguation)